is a leading UK company law case on the principle that directors must avoid any possibility of a conflict of interest, particular relating to corporate opportunities.  It was not decided under, but is relevant to, section 175 of the Companies Act 2006.

Facts
Bhullar Bros Ltd was owned by families of two brothers. Each side owned 50% of ordinary shares. The directors were Mr Mohan Bhullar, his son Tim, Mr Sohan Bhullar and his sons Inderjit and Jatinderjit. The company had a grocery store at 44 Springwood Street, Huddersfield. It also owned an investment property called Springbank Works, Leeds Road, which was leased to a bowling alley business called UK Superbowl Ltd. In 1998 the families began to fall out. Mohan and Tim told the board they wished for the company to buy no further investment properties. Negotiations began to split up the company, but they were unsuccessful. In 1999, Inderjit went bowling at the UK Superbowl Ltd alley. He noticed that the carpark next door (called White Hall Mill) was on sale. He set up a company called Silvercrest Ltd (owned by him and Jatinderjit) and bought, but did not tell Bhullar Bros Ltd. But Mohan and Tim found out and brought an unfair prejudice claim (now s 994 Companies Act 2006) on the basis that Inderjit and Jatinderjit had breached their fiduciary duty of loyalty to the company.

Judgment
Jonathan Parker LJ held that there was a clear breach of the rule that directors must avoid a conflict of interest.

Brooke LJ and Schiemann LJ concurred.

See also
Keech v Sandford [1726] EWHC Ch J76
Whelpdale v Cookson  (1747) 1 Ves Sen 9; 27 ER 856
Aberdeen Railway Co v Blaikie Brothers [1843–60] All ER Rep 252, self dealing case
Parker v McKenna (1874–75) LR 10 Ch App 96, per James LJ that the rule is necessary for "the safety of mankind"
Bray v Ford [1896] AC 44 at 51-52, per Lord Herschell, the no possibility of conflict rule is "based upon the consideration that, human nature being what it is, there is danger of the person holding a fiduciary position being swayed by interest rather than duty…."
Regal (Hastings) Ltd v Gulliver [1967] 2 AC 134n 
Boardman v Phipps [1967] 2 AC 46
Industrial Development Consultants v Cooley [1972] 1 WLR 443
Canadian Aero Service Ltd. v. O'Malley (1973) 40 DLR (3d) 371

Notes

References

External links
Obituary, 'Sohan Singh Bhullar Founder of thriving business and community leader' (9.9.2008) Huddersfield Daily Examiner

United Kingdom company case law
Court of Appeal (England and Wales) cases
2003 in case law
2003 in British law